Adamovské Kochanovce is a village and municipality in Trenčín District in the Trenčín Region of north-western Slovakia.

History
The village was created in 1960 by the unification of Adamovce, Malé Bierovce and Kochanovce.

Geography
It has a population of about 782 people.

Genealogical resources

The records for genealogical research are available at the state archive "Statny Archiv in Bratislava, Slovakia"

 Roman Catholic church records (births/marriages/deaths): 1701-1763 (parish B), 1714–1895 (parish C)
 Lutheran church records (births/marriages/deaths): 1784-1896 (parish A)
 Census records 1869 of Adamovske Kochanovce are not available at the state archive.

See also
 List of municipalities and towns in Slovakia

External links
https://web.archive.org/web/20070513023228/http://www.statistics.sk/mosmis/eng/run.html
Surnames of living people in Adamovske Kochanovce

Villages and municipalities in Trenčín District